The 1993 Bucknell Bison football team was an American football team that represented Bucknell University during the 1993 NCAA Division I-AA football season. Bucknell finished third in the Patriot League.

In their fifth year under head coach Lou Maranzana, the Bison compiled a 4–7 record. Cecil Boone, Travis Kopp, Russ Strohecker and Dan Zappa were the team captains.

The Bison were outscored 302 to 193. Bucknell's 3–2 conference record placed third in the six-team Patriot League standings.

Bucknell played its home games at Christy Mathewson–Memorial Stadium on the university campus in Lewisburg, Pennsylvania.

Schedule

References

Bucknell
Bucknell Bison football seasons
Bucknell Bison football